Ruiz de Alarcón is a Spanish noble name. The name Alarcón was first given to Ferrán Martínez de Ceballos by Alfonso VIII of Castile after the former had successfully driven the Moors from the fortress of Alarcón near Cuenca in 1177. His son's name was Ruí de Alarcón and later, in the thirteenth century, his descendants took the name Ruíz de Alarcón to distinguish themselves from other branches of the Alarcón family. The most famous member of the Ruiz de Alarcón family is the 17th century playwright Juan Ruiz de Alarcón. Juan's brother Hernando Ruíz de Alarcón y Mendoza, who was a priest in Taxco, is known for having written a treatise documenting the non-Christian religious practices of the Nahua Indians of central Mexico.

References

Spanish-language surnames